Ocean Dunes High School is a public high school in Florence, Oregon, United States. It is located at Camp Florence, operated by the Oregon Youth Authority.

Academics
In 2008, 8% of the school's seniors received a high school diploma. Of 13 students, one graduated, nine dropped out, and three were still in high school the following year.

References

External links 

High schools in Lane County, Oregon
Public high schools in Oregon